Year of the Dog is a 2007 American comedy-drama film written and directed by Mike White (in his directorial debut), and starring Molly Shannon, Laura Dern, Regina King, Thomas McCarthy, Josh Pais, John C. Reilly and Peter Sarsgaard. The film tells the story of a woman who goes from having one pet dog at home to becoming a vegan and an animal rights activist.

It premiered January 20, 2007, at the 2007 Sundance Film Festival.

Plot

Peggy is a 40-something administrative assistant with no social or love life. She is closest to her dog, Pencil. Late one evening he refuses to come in, so a sleepy Peggy leaves him out overnight. The next morning she finds him in her neighbor Al's yard, whimpering in pain. The vet can't save him, Pencil dies of poisoning.

People in Peggy's life are sympathetic but most don't understand her grief. Best friend Layla tells her Pencil kept her from finding romance. Her emotionally sterile sister-in-law Bret and brother Pier are too self-absorbed to notice.

Peggy's neighbor, Al, asks her out. Starting out well, oblivious to Peggy's reaction, he shares that he shot his own dog while hunting then shows off his knife collection and hunting trophies. She asks to see his garage, seeking the poison that killed Pencil. Al makes a pass which Peggy rejects.

Peggy gets a call from Newt from the SPCA who was present when Pencil died as he has a dog for her to adopt: Valentine, a King Shepherd with behavioral problems. Newt agrees to help train him, and they begin to spend a lot of time together.

Through Newt, Peggy is exposed to veganism and animal rights. She becomes a vegan and begins helping him to get various animals adopted. Chastised by her boss Robin for her commitment, she retaliates by donating to various animal-related charities using checkbook.

Peggy and Newt share a kiss, Newt declining to go any further, which she mistakes for chivalry. When she confesses her feelings he reveals that he is celibate and asexual. Peggy reacts badly, shutting Newt out and focusing on her new relationship with Valentine. 

Valentine's sporadically violent behavior worsens without Newt's instruction. He bites Peggy and his continual barking causes Al to complain. She responds rudely, as she is sure something in his garage poisoned Pencil.

Peggy's animal rights interest deepens, particularly prevention of animal testing and support of farms keeping animals out of slaughterhouses. Her new belief system is looked at flippantly by Pier and Bret; when she announces she is a vegan, he says it won't last long.

Over New Years, Peggy babysits Pier's children, leaving Valentine with Newt. She takes Lissie and Benji to a rescued animal farm to introduce them to their "adopted" chicken (a charity sponsorship) she got them for Christmas. Intensely moved by the experience, Peggy wants to show them a slaughterhouse, but the children freak out.

Peggy gets drunk and, showing Lissie the rack of furs in her mother's closet, when she asks her opinion of them she says it's "mean". Peggy passes out and in the morning finds the furs ruined in the bathtub full of water. She goes to Newt's to get Valentine and finds him weeping. Valentine killed his crippled dog Buttons, so Newt had Valentine put down as he knew Peggy couldn't do it.

Rushing to the pound, Peggy is too late to save Valentine. She impulsively adopts 15 dogs slated to die, saying she works with the SPCA and will find them all homes. At work Peggy is confronted by her boss, who has discovered the fraudulent checks, and fires her.

Peggy's life falls apart, she barely leaves home, which is practically destroyed by the dogs. Al complains, saying if she does not control them he will. While she is out, Newt confiscates the dogs and leaves a warning notice from the SPCA. 

Erroneously blaming Al, Peggy sneaks into his house and finds molluscicide with a hole chewed into the corner, confirming her suspicions about Pencil's death. Zombie-like, she drags the bag through the house, leaking poison pellets everywhere. She takes one of Al's hunting knives and hides. When he and a girlfriend return home, Peggy attacks with the knife. Al wrestles it away from her and calls the police.

Pier and Bret try to help. Peggy's boss will rehire her if she pays back everything and goes to counselling. When they ask why Peggy attacked Al, she says she wanted him to experience being hunted.

Peggy returns to work and is greeted warmly. But an internet search soon leads her to an upcoming animal rights protest. Sending an email to her coworkers, boss, Newt, Pier and Bret, she says she must follow her soul. She abandons her former life, heading off to the protest, content that fighting for animals is her greater reason for living (not child-rearing, career, or intimate human relationships).

Cast
 Molly Shannon - Peggy Spade
 Laura Dern - Bret Spade
 Regina King - Layla
 Thomas McCarthy - Pier Spade
 Josh Pais - Robin
 John C. Reilly - Al
 Peter Sarsgaard - Newt
 Amy Schlagel and Zoe Schlagel - Lissie
 Dale Godboldo - Don
 Inara George - Holly
 Liza Weil - Trishelle

Critical reception

 

Associated Press film critic David Germain named the film the #10 best film of 2007.

The film won Best Feature Film at the 22nd Genesis Awards.

Box office performance
The film received a limited release on April 13, 2007, and on its opening weekend grossed $108,223 in seven theaters. The film's widest release was in 152 theaters in its fifth week.

The film grossed $1,596,953 worldwide — $1,540,141 in the United States and Canada and $56,812 in other territories.

References

External links
 
 
 
 
 
 Year of the Dog at Sundance.org
 Year of the Dog at Reelgood.com
 The Director Interviews: Mike White, Year of the Dog at Filmmaker Magazine

2007 films
2000s English-language films
2007 comedy-drama films
2007 independent films
American comedy-drama films
Films about animal rights
Films directed by Mike White
Films about dogs
Films about pets
Films scored by Christophe Beck
Films with screenplays by Mike White
Paramount Vantage films
Plan B Entertainment films
2007 directorial debut films
2000s American films
English-language comedy-drama films